Xu Xiaodong ( (Pinyin: Xú  Xiǎodōng); born 15 November 1979), nicknamed "Mad Dog", is a Chinese mixed martial artist (MMA) who is known for challenging and fighting fraudulent and traditional martial artists. He gained prominence online after he was filmed defeating self-proclaimed Tai chi master Wei Lei in 2017.

Early life 
Xu was born on 15 November 1979 in Beijing. In 1996, he entered , where he was trained in sanshou and boxing under Mei Huizhi (梅惠志) and Zhang Xingzheng (张兴正). He competed at least twice at the Beijing Sanshou Invitational Tournament, finishing as the champion and the first runner-up, respectively. He became a sanshou coach at Shenshahai School after graduation.

Mixed martial arts career 
In 2001, Xu began training for mixed martial arts (MMA) and Muay Thai. He was drawn to the fighting style because of how free it was. A year later, he, Anpei (安培)  and Wang Yu (王宇) founded the first MMA team in Beijing, Bad Boys (恶童军团). In 2003, Xu fought against Brazilian jiu-jitsu practitioner, Andy Pi (毕思安) in a televised bout. During the fight, Xu broke Pi's forearm with a kick however Pi managed to eventually get Xu to the ground where he won via Armbar submission. Pi would later go on to found the first professional MMA promotion in China, Art of War Fighting Championship.

In 2004, Xu tore his Cruciate ligament in a football match and had to get it reconstructed at Peking University Third Hospital. It was considered a partial disability which as a result led him to transition to full time coaching in 2005.

Xu was frustrated by what he saw as fraud and hypocrisy amongst martial arts practitioners, and wanted to demonstrate the superiority of modern fighting styles. Some in China believe that kung fu masters have supernatural powers, and self-described masters, including Wei Lei, were known to make such claims online. Xu started a dispute with Wei on social media, beginning with a demand that Wei provide evidence of his abilities, and culminating in a bare-knuckle fight in a basement in Chengdu in 2017; Xu won convincingly in less than 20 seconds.

After the fight went viral, there was significant blowback on social media where he was accused of disparaging Chinese culture and his family received death threats. Beverage tycoon Chen Sheng offered over a million US dollars to any traditional tai chi fighter who could beat him. Following this, police stopped a fight against another self-proclaimed tai chi master, Ma Baoguo who allegedly called them in, and Xu was banned for organizing tournaments at his gym. Xu continued to fight self-proclaimed tai chi masters.

In 2018 Xu was injured fighting in a series of sparring matches with kickboxers at a Chinese MMA gym. He was left with a fractured skull and needing 26 stitches around his eyebrow following his fourth sparring partner. During this year Xu would also receive vocal support from Shaolin abbot Shi Yongxin, who claimed that Xu's actions against fake kung fu artists was good for the traditional art form.

Xu was sued in 2019 for calling tai chi Grandmaster Chen Xiaowang a fraud, and the Chinese court ordered him to pay Chen approximately US$60,000 in damages and to apologize for seven consecutive days on social media. Additionally, his [ credit rating] was lowered to the point where he could not rent, own property, stay in certain hotels, travel on high speed rail or buy plane tickets. The restrictions were lifted after he paid US$40,000 in both legal fees and the cost of placing the apology.

In May 2019, Xu defeated another martial artist; but was only able to do so wearing clown makeup to hide his face and by fighting under a pseudonym. It took him 36 hours to reach the fight location due to his low  credit score, and Chinese search engines reportedly had stopped listing him. Later that year, Xu had to wear Peking Opera face paint and cover his back tattoo during his match with Japanese kickboxer Yuichiro Nagashima so that the fight which took place in Thailand could stream in China. The fight was hosted under kickboxing rules in the first round and mixed martial arts in the second; and saw Xiaodong eventually winning by TKO by ground and pound in the second round.

By defeating Nagashima, Xu believed that he could pressure Yi Long, whom Xu has claimed has rigged competitions, to face him in a match. Yi Long has previously criticized Xu for his attitude and claimed that Xu himself is in fact a fraud.

In November 2019 an Iron Palm master threatened to break his arm in a fight, but apologized and backed down after Xu accepted and suggested putting 200,000 yuan on the outcome.

In July 2020 the Chinese Wushu Association urged practitioners to refrain from calling themselves "master". This was interpreted by Bloody Elbow (MMA news site) and Radii China as being in response to Xu's complaints about "kung fu fakery". In December, Xiaodong defeated Chen Yong, a tai chi master who had challenged him in 2018, in only 10 seconds.

Political views
In June 2019, Xu made a video on YouTube claiming that he wished to become an Australian citizen while commenting on Chinese actors who live abroad or have foreign passports, claiming that "all patriots are going abroad … long live China".

In August 2019, Xu spoke out on Twitter, Sina Weibo, and YouTube questioning the government's reporting of the Hong Kong protests, stating that the Chinese government was running a "smear campaign", and met with human rights lawyer Chen Qiushi who had shared similar views. Xu has also clarified on his YouTube account that his statements were about how the mainland government should adhere to the One China, Two Systems policy as promised, rather than a call for Hong Kong independence. He was subsequently visited by Chinese authorities and had his Sina Weibo account wiped for the eighth time.

After Chen Qiushi disappeared while reporting on the COVID-19 outbreak in Wuhan, Xu, a friend of Chen, gave updates on both his and Chen's YouTube channels reporting Chen was uncontactable by family and friends while police claimed Chen had merely been placed in isolation. Xu would later claim that Chen was in a "safe place" but under government supervision.

Xu has also come to the defense of Fang Fang, a Chinese author living in Wuhan who published the Wuhan Diary which related the experiences of people living under lock down in the city by the Chinese government. Fang Fang received widespread criticism from Chinese nationalists, including Tai Chi practitioner Wei Lei, who was defeated by Xu in 2017. Wei called for martial artists in Wuhan to assault Fang for her work while Xu defended the author who he claims was mild in criticism and was being truthful in her accounts.

YouTube channel
Xu has run a YouTube channel called  since 2015, consisting of 45 minutes long sports show style monologues, largely about MMA and his own experiences. He records the show in Beijing, and sends it to a friend in America to upload it. Most of his audience are from Hong Kong, Taiwan, or are Chinese firewall jumpers.

References

External links
Brother Dong's Hot Takes
Tai Chi Vs. MMA: Xu Xiaodong Vs. Wei Lei

1979 births
Living people
Chinese anti-communists
Chinese male mixed martial artists
Sportspeople from Beijing
Chinese sanshou practitioners